Donata Maria Assunta Gottardi (born October 17, 1950 in Verona) is an Italian politician. She was a member of the European Parliament from May 8, 2006, when she took up a seat vacated after the 2006 Italian general election, until the 2009 European elections. She represented the Olive Tree coalition within the Party of European Socialists parliamentary group.

References

1950 births
Living people
Politicians of Veneto
Democratic Party (Italy) MEPs
MEPs for Italy 2004–2009
21st-century women MEPs for Italy